George's Chapel or George's Meeting House was built in 1760 (the year of the coronation of George III) as a Presbyterian chapel. It was sold in 1987 and first became an antiques centre before being sold to JD Wetherspoon, who re-opened it as a pub in 2005, preserving many of the original features. It is a grade I listed building.

References 

Churches in Exeter
Grade I listed churches in Devon